Age of Mythology (AoM) is a real-time strategy video game developed by Ensemble Studios and published by Microsoft Game Studios. It was released on October 31, 2002 in North America and on November 14, 2002 in Europe

A spin-off from the Age of Empires series, Age of Mythology takes some of its inspiration from mythology and legends of the Greeks, Egyptians, and Norse, rather than from actual historical events. Many gameplay elements are similar to the Age of Empires series. Its campaign follows an Atlantean admiral, Arkantos, who is forced to travel through the lands of the game's three cultures, hunting for a cyclops who is in league with Poseidon against Atlantis.

Age of Mythology was commercially successful, going platinum four months after its release after selling over one million units. In 2003, it was followed by an expansion pack, Age of Mythology: The Titans. On May 8, 2014, Age of Mythology: Extended Edition was released for Windows via Steam. This was followed by a second expansion pack, Age of Mythology: Tale of the Dragon, released on January 28, 2016. On October 25, 2022, Age of Mythology: Retold was announced.

Gameplay

Like many other real-time strategy games, Age of Mythology is based on defeating enemy units and towns, building your own units and towns, and training villagers and fighters. In this way, players are able to defeat and conquer rival towns and civilizations. Players advance their tribe through four "Ages": starting in the Archaic Age, the player may upgrade to the Classical Age, the Heroic Age, and finally, the Mythic Age. Each upgrade to a higher Age unlocks new units and technologies for the player, which strengthens their settlement. However, upgrading requires a sum of resources to be paid and a certain prerequisite building to be constructed.

There are three playable cultures in Age of Mythology: the Greeks, Egyptians, and Norse. Each culture has three "major gods"—important deities such as Ra, Zeus, or Odin. The player chooses their major god before the game begins. Every time a player advances to the next age, a "minor god" is selected. Minor gods are slightly less significant historically than their major counterparts. Some minor gods include Bast and Aphrodite. All gods grant the player unique technologies, myth units, and a unique "god power"—A one-time special ability that can either damage an opponent, or benefit the player that uses it.

There are four major resources in Age of Mythology: food, wood, gold, and favor; unlike previous games by Ensemble Studios, this game does not include the stone resource. Resources can be used to train units, construct buildings, and research technologies, among other things. Civilian units—namely, the Greek villagers, Norse gatherers and dwarfs, the Egyptian laborers, and fishing boats—are used to gather resources. Hunting animals, gathering berries, harvesting livestock, farming, and fishing are all methods by which food can be gathered. Wood is gathered only by chopping down trees, and gold is gathered from either gold mines or from trade. Players can purchase upgrades that increase the rate of gathering these resources. Favor is acquired in different ways by different cultures: Greek players gain it by having villagers pray at temples; Egyptian players earn it by building monuments; and Norse players receive it by fighting/hunting animals or by possessing heroes. Resources can be exchanged at a player's market, with the exception of favor.

Units
Every unit in the game takes up between one and five "population slots". Building additional houses or Town Centers—the main building in a player's town—increases the population capacity, up to a maximum of 300.

Units can be classified into seven categories; infantry, archers, cavalry—the three of which are broadly classified as human units—siege units, naval units, heroes, and myth units (monsters and other creatures from mythology).
The rock-paper-scissors model governs most units in battle. For example, infantry does additional damage to cavalry, cavalry does additional damage to archers, and archers do additional damage to infantry. The same rock-paper-scissors formation exists in the three different types of naval units—arrow ships, siege ships, and hammer ships. Siege units are generally exempt from the rock-paper-scissors model but are instead able to destroy buildings easily while being vulnerable to cavalry attacks. Heroes are extremely effective against myth units, which in turn do large amounts of damage against human units. Heroes are also able to collect relics, which grant the player additional economic or military bonuses when deposited in a player's temple. Most units can be upgraded, making them better at certain tasks.

Buildings
Buildings in Age of Mythology can generally be split into three categories: economic, military, and defensive. The most important economic building is the Town Center, which is similar to the building of the same name in the Age of Empires series games. Most civilian units are trained at the Town Center, as are some improvements. Most importantly, players advance Age via the building. The Town Center provides 15 population slots, and building additional houses will earn the player 10 additional slots per house. In the Heroic Age, players may claim settlements (unclaimed Town Centres) for additional population slots. In some cases owning all town centres will trigger a countdown to victory. Other economic buildings include the farm and market.

Buildings are able to research improvements, as well as provide resources for the player. All units except civilians and myth units are trained at military buildings. These buildings differ in name and purpose between culture, but all are able to train similar units. Military buildings are also used to research military specific technologies, such as armor upgrades, and attack improvements.

Walls and towers are defensive structures, which are not able to train units, and are used only for the purposes of defense. They are able to research some upgrades, although these are generally only useful to the building performing the research. Another type of building available to players, is a Wonder: a grand building that represents an architectural achievement of the civilization. In certain game modes, once a player builds a wonder, a ten-minute countdown begins. If the wonder is still standing after the countdown ends, the player who built the wonder wins.

Scenario editor

The Age of Mythology editor is far more advanced than that of its predecessor, the Age of Empires II scenario editor. As well as standard unit placement facilities, the editor allows units to be overlapped, and it facilitates for large mountains, and steep terrain. Triggers, a popular aspect of scenario design in Age of Empires II, are also present in Age of Mythology'''s editor, as well as cinematics and other special effects.

Campaign
Unlike the campaign modes in Age of Empires and Age of Empires II, Age of Mythology only has one central campaign, Fall of the Trident. The campaign is significantly longer than campaigns in previous games, with a total of 32 scenarios.

Multiplayer
Multiplayer is a highly popular aspect of Age of Mythology. Most multiplayer games are played through Ensemble Studios Online (ESO), or via a direct LAN or IP connection.Age of Mythology included unlimited free multiplayer accounts on ESO.  it is no longer possible to create new accounts but access to already created ones is still possible. Similar in function to Blizzard Entertainment's Battle.net, ESO allows players to play matches, as well as chat with other players.

In multiplayer games, there are seven different game types available, all of which are provided as standard with the game: Supremacy—the standard game mode—includes randomly generated map and all gameplay aspects; Conquest is similar to Supremacy, but victory is only possible by defeating all other players; in Deathmatch players begin the game with high resources, but the game is otherwise the same as Supremacy; in Lightning, the gameplay is identical to Supremacy, but the game plays at twice the normal speed; in Nomad mode, players start with one civilian unit, and no Town Center, and must build up on a settlement; the goal of King of the Hill is to control a monument in the center of the map for a set period of time; and in Sudden Death, a player loses if their Town Center is destroyed, and they fail to rebuild it within a set period of time.

Multiplayer tournaments and LAN parties are popular throughout the world, with many players visiting computer gaming lounges to participate.

Campaign summary
Atlantean admiral and war hero Arkantos arrives at Atlantis after several years of warfare to see his son, Kastor. However, he is ordered by the Atlantean councillor and theocrat, Krios, to sail to Troy to assist Agamemnon in the Trojan War. Just then, the island is attacked by krakens and the Black Sails, a group of pirate bandits led by the minotaur Kamos, a fierce enemy of Arkantos. After the trident from  Poseidon's statue gets stolen, Arkantos raids the pirate settlement on a nearby island, where he recovers the trident, although Kamos escapes on a leviathan and vows revenge. Arkantos sends the trident back to Atlantis and sails away, leaving Kastor behind against the latter's wishes.

Arkantos travels to Troy to assist Agamemnon. After a series of skirmishes against Troy, fighting alongside Ajax and Odysseus, they devise the plan involving the Trojan Horse, and swiftly win the war. Afterwards, Ajax recommends Arkantos to sail to Ioklos to repair his ships, which are too heavily damaged for the trip back to Atlantis. When they arrive, the port has been raided by bandits, who have imprisoned the centaur Chiron. After rescuing Chiron, he reveals that the leader of the bandits is a man named Kemsyt.

Chiron takes them north to locate the other prisoners, who are being forced to dig up an entrance to the underworld by Gargarensis, a cyclops warlord and commander of both Kemsyt and Kamos. The heroes destroy Gargarensis's base and confront him, but he escapes to the underworld of Erebus using the entrance. The heroes follow Gargarensis into the underworld, where they find him trying to burst open a large door in the stone with a huge battering ram. Cautious of his motives, they destroy the ram. An amused Gargarensis confronts them and causes a cave to collapse before escaping, forcing the heroes to find another way out. With the help of the dead, they reach three temples dedicated to the Greek gods Poseidon, Zeus, and Hades. Arkantos prays to Atlantis's patron Poseidon for help but receives none. He then prays to Zeus, who creates a staircase to the surface.

Reaching the surface, they find themselves in Egypt, where they help a Nubian mercenary leader named Amanra in fighting Kemsyt, who is there to steal a relic that Amanra's men are excavating. She reveals that the Egyptian god Osiris has been killed and had his body parts scattered across the desert by Set, who aids Gargarensis. Amanra plans to reunite Osiris's body parts scattered throughout the desert, bringing him back. During this time. Arkantos falls asleep and is met by Athena in his dreams, who reveals Gargarensis's motives:

Ages before, the Earth was ruled by the Titans under Kronos. Zeus stopped Kronos and imprisoned him in Tartarus, of which several entrances to exist behind adamantine doors across the world. However, Poseidon, who is envious of Zeus's power, is trying to free Kronos and the Titans in order to destroy Zeus so he could claim the throne. Gargarensis is aiding him because Poseidon and Kronos have promised him immortality as a reward. Athena asks Arkantos to stop Gargarensis at all costs, as Zeus himself cannot interfere.

In order to stop him, Arkantos travels with Ajax, while Amanra and Chiron go their separate ways to find the pieces of Osiris. Amanra goes north, where she finds Kemsyt's fortress on an island. With the aid of nearby villagers, she captures the piece he had stolen, but Kemsyt escapes. Chiron finds and recovers another piece hidden beneath a giant tamarisk tree, and is aided by Norsemen, who are seeking Gargarensis to try and stop him from causing Ragnarok. Meanwhile, Arkantos and Ajax find the last piece in Kamos's main fortress. Arkantos raids the fortress, secures the piece, and mortally wounds Kamos with a spear, who falls to his death.

The heroes gather all the pieces outside Osiris's pyramid, which protects another gate to Tartarus. Osiris is resurrected and defeats Gargarensis's army but the cyclops escapes, heading north to the Norselands, the location of another Tartarus gate.

Following Gargarensis, Ajax and Arkantos find Odysseus's wrecked ship on the coast of an island, and so decide to land to look for him. Upon landing, both men are turned into boars by the sorceress Circe. They proceed to rescue Odysseus and his men, who have also been cursed, reverse the curse on them and destroy Circe's fortress. Odysseus continues his journey home, while Arkantos and Ajax continue north.

When they reach the frozen Norselands, they are given directions to the underworld by dwarf brothers Brokk and Eitri in return for repelling giants from their forge. Later, an elderly man named Skult gives them a banner to unite the Norse clans. However, the Norsemen are instead enraged, and the heroes are forced to defeat their chieftains in combat. Valkyries arrive and explain that the flag is actually the banner of the evil giant Folstag and the plan a trick by Skult, who is actually the god Loki in disguise, another ally of Gargarensis.

With the help of the valkyrie Reginleif, who sent the Norsemen to Egypt, the heroes locate Gargarensis and the Tartarus gate. Inside the Norse underworld Niflheim, they are pursued by fire giants until Chiron sacrifices himself to hold them off, saving his friends. While Gargarensis is trying to knock down the gate, Brokk and Eitri have been rebuilding Thor's hammer (shattered by Loki), that upon completion seals the gate. Back on the surface, they confront Gargarensis with the help of Odysseus, who has made a detour to help them, and the cyclops is captured and beheaded by Ajax.

Arkantos sails back to Atlantis. When he brings out Gargarensis's head to tie it to the mast in victory, the bag sprouts ravens and he finds the head is actually Kemsyt's, another trick by Loki. Gargarensis is still alive and is trying to break the final gate holding Kronos, which is located at the centre of Atlantis. Gargarensis has captured and fortified Atlantis, and Poseidon himself has possessed a statue in the city center to protect him. Arkantos builds a wonder to Zeus and gains his blessing, giving him god-like power and enabling him to confront Gargarensis and the living statue at the temple of Poseidon. With his new powers, Arkantos defeats the statue, and Gargarensis is impaled by its trident as it collapses. All of Atlantis then collapses into the ocean, along with Arkantos. While the remaining heroes sail away with the surviving Atlanteans, Athena revives Arkantos and rewards him by making him a god.

The Golden Gift
An official campaign, The Golden Gift, was released as a download on Microsoft's website. The campaign follows the adventures of Brokk and Eitri, the dwarves who appeared in the initial campaign. The plot unfolds with both dwarves planning to create a giant golden boar as an offering to the Norse god Freyr. While working separately, Brokk is approached by Skult (also from Fall of the Trident) who warns him that Eitri is making preparations to create the boar without his brother, of which Eitri is also told the same about Brokk. As both brothers race to complete the boar in the great forge, Skult steals the finished piece and holds it in Loki's fortress. The brothers eventually assault the base, and the boar is retrieved and successfully offered to Freyr.

Development
Ensemble Studios began work on their first fully 3D engine at the same time as their development of Age of Empires II: The Age of Kings. Named the BANG! Engine, this was announced in January 2001, for use in a new game, codenamed RTSIII. RTSIII was eventually revealed as Age of Mythology. In developing Age of Mythology, Ensemble Studios decided to move away from the center of the Age of Empires series history, to avoid becoming stale and repetitive. This allowed them to work with new ideas and concepts.

Following the announcement of the game for September 2002, a trial version was released. It contained five scenarios of the game's campaign, and two random maps. In the trial version, the player can only select Zeus, but there are nine gods available in the full version of the game. There was debate during Age of Mythologys construction concerning the unbalanced nature of god powers and how to make them "fair" while still maintaining an element of fun in them. It was concluded that the best way to make it fair for everyone was to limit the use of god powers to one a game. Age of Mythology underwent a large amount of beta-testing during its developmental phase, as Ensemble Studios attempted to create a more balanced and competitive game than its predecessors. Greg T. Street commented that one of the reasons Age of Mythology became so popular was because the development team spent many hours working on the game through active testing, rather than just taking advice from a "faceless drone in another building".

Music
The official soundtrack was released on October 22, 2002, under the record label "Sumthing Else". The score was written by Stephen Rippy and Kevin McMullan. Rippy cites musicians such as Peter Gabriel, Tuatara, Bill Laswell, Talvin Singh and Tchad Blake as inspirations for the soundtrack. The musical work done on Age of Mythology was unlike anything Rippy had done before; an example of this was "writing for a seventy-piece orchestra and then flying out to Washington to record it".

Music 4 Games' reviewer, Jay Semerad, heaped Age of Mythologys soundtrack with praise. He summarized his review by declaring: "In all, the Age of Mythology soundtrack is an experience that should not be missed. It's easily one of my favorite soundtracks from this past year." Semerad was also astonished, and appreciative, of the use of instruments such as the ney flute, tabla and toy piano, all of which he said produced "some innovative analog and synthesized electronic effects". His only critique was that at times some of the background melodies were "bound to a simple harmonization", and lacking any "real bold or innovative purpose".

Expansions and other versions

The TitansAge of Mythology: The Titans is an expansion to Age of Mythology, released on September 30, 2003. The expansion added a new culture, the Atlanteans, as well as several new units, including titans. Critics and fans received the expansion with enthusiasm, although its ratings were slightly lower on average than those of the original version.

MythologiesAge of Empires: Mythologies is a spin-off of Age of Empires: The Age of Kings, but with the unique mythology-based gameplay elements of Age of Mythology. It was developed by Griptonite Games for the Nintendo DS.

Extended EditionAge of Mythology: Extended Edition is a compilation that includes the main game and The Titans expansion. It adds Steamworks integration, Twitch support, an enhanced observer mode, native HD widescreen and improved water and lighting. It was released on May 8, 2014. The Extended Edition was developed by SkyBox Labs.

Tale of the Dragon
On September 18, 2015, a new expansion was announced, Tale of the Dragon. It was co-developed by SkyBox Labs and Forgotten Empires, the latter having worked on new expansions for Age of Empires II. The expansion added a new culture, the Chinese, with the major gods Fuxi, Nüwa, and Shennong. The expansion also features a new campaign and multiplayer maps, as well as other features. It was released on January 28, 2016.

Reception
In the United States, Age of Mythology sold 870,000 copies and earned $31.9 million by August 2006, after its release in October 2002. It was the country's 10th best-selling computer game between January 2000 and August 2006. Combined sales of the game and its Titans expansion had reached 1.3 million units in the United States by August 2006. Age of Mythology received a "Gold" sales award from the Entertainment and Leisure Software Publishers Association (ELSPA), indicating sales of at least 200,000 copies in the United Kingdom.

Critical receptionAge of Mythology received critical acclaim, reaching an estimated one million units sold within five months of its release. The game was nominated for the Academy of Interactive Arts & Sciences' Interactive Achievement Awards for "Computer Game of the Year" and "Computer Strategy Game of the Year". GameSpot named Age of Mythology the best computer game of November 2002. It was a runner-up for GameSpots annual "Best Single-Player Strategy Game on PC" and "Best Multiplayer Strategy Game on PC" awards, which went respectively to Medieval: Total War and Warcraft III.Age of Mythologys graphics were praised by the majority of reviewers. IGN reviewer Steve Butts stated that "some fantastic effects and believable animations make this one a joy to watch. The differences between the armies and environments are awesome." As such, he gave the graphics a rating of 9 out of 10. Meanwhile, GameSpot reviewer Greg Kasavin also rated the graphics 9 out of 10, stating that "Age of Mythology is a great-looking game, filled with bright colors and carefully detailed animations." Game Revolution also appreciated Age of Mythologys graphics, stating in their review that the "new 3D landscape looks good", and including graphics as one of the positives in the review summary. PC Gamer reviewer William Harms admired the graphics, "The environments, units, and buildings are packed with detail," and excitedly commented on the effects: "What really impressed me, though, were the game's animations. When a Minotaur smacks a dude with his club, the schmoe goes flying, skids on the ground, and then bounces back into the air."

The game's soundtrack was also praised by reviewers, although several commented that it was repetitive and predictable at times. IGN described it as "great, if repetitive, music", whilst Game Revolution declared that the sound "really showcases Ensemble's continued attention to detail", before going on to praise the audio snippets in various languages.IGN was pleased with Age of Mythologys campaign, and not bothered by its length. Instead, they stated that "the meaningful and engaging single player campaign provides a nearly flawless experience." However, GameSpot was slightly critical of it, claiming that "while some of the campaign missions do feature some unusual circumstances or objectives that change, the game's story isn't incredibly engaging." This was compromised by stating that Age of Empires fans wouldn't expect an amazing campaign; they would "make a beeline for the game's random map mode, anyway." PC Gamer elaborated more on the campaign however, saying: "many of the missions are extremely well-crafted", and that "sprinkled throughout these encounters are moments of genuine comedy — a truly delightful surprise." However, they still found reasons to criticize: "Regrettably, most of AoMs missions suffer from one recurring, frustrating problem: a severe case of 'build base-itis.'" The reviewer elaborated: "I know base-building is inherent to the genre, but even the most ardent fan will be put off by just how much there is. What's most disappointing is that AoMs setting really lends itself to imaginative mission design — and I don't think the designers took full advantage of the backdrop, which is a shame."

The editors of Computer Games Magazine named Age of Mythology the fourth-best computer game of 2002, and called it "an amazingly well-balanced game, both in terms of its pacing and its mix of standard historical and fantastical units". It was a nominee for PC Gamer USs "2002 Best Real-Time Strategy Game" award, which ultimately went to Warcraft III: Reign of Chaos.

Scientific studyAge of Mythologys artificial intelligence (AI) was used by four Austrian researchers—Christoph Hermann, Helmuth Melcher, Stefan Rank and Robert Trappl—in a study into the value of emotions in real-time strategy games. According to the abstract, "We were interested whether incorporating a simple emotional model to an existing bot-script improves playing strength." The results of the study determined that of the four bots they tested, the neurotic bot was most capable of defeating Age of Mythology''s default AI, followed by the aggressive one. Neither bot was defeated by the standard AI, but the neurotic bot won, on average, twenty five percent more rapidly. Plans were made to extend the research in the future by pitting the neurotic bot against a human player.

See also
 List of PC games

Notes

References

External links
 
 Official Ensemble Studios Age of Mythology website at the Internet Archive
 MacSoft Age of Mythology website at the Internet Archive

 
2002 video games
Action-adventure games
Agamemnon
Ancient Egypt in fiction
Ancient Greece in fiction
Circe
Cultural depictions of Achilles
Cultural depictions of Jason
Cultural depictions of Medusa
Cultural depictions of the Trojan War
Cultural depictions of Theseus
Fiction about deicide
Fiction about deities
Esports games
Greek and Roman deities in fiction
Iolcus in fiction
MacOS games
MacSoft
Microsoft franchises
Multiplayer and single-player video games
Real-time strategy video games
Roc (mythology)
SkyBox Labs games
Video games based on Chinese mythology
Video games based on Egyptian mythology
Video games based on Greek mythology
Video games based on multiple mythologies
Video games based on Norse mythology
Video games based on works by Homer
Video games developed in the United States
Video games scored by Kevin McMullan
Video games scored by Stephen Rippy
Video games set in antiquity
Video games set in Atlantis
Video games set in China
Video games set in Egypt
Video games set in Greece
Video games set in Norway
Video games with expansion packs
Video games with Steam Workshop support
Viking Age in popular culture
Windows games
Works based on the Iliad
Works based on the Odyssey